is a 2002 bullet hell scrolling shoot 'em up video game developed by Team Shanghai Alice. It is the sixth game in the Touhou Project series, and the first Touhou game to be released for Microsoft Windows. The story follows either the miko Reimu Hakurei or the magician Marisa Kirisame, as they fight through the world of Gensokyo to find the cause of a vampiric mist, covering the sky scarlet red in the middle of summer.

ZUN, the developer of the Touhou Project series, had planned to end the series after the release of Mystic Square in 1998. After graduating, ZUN started work at Taito as a game developer and composed music for games created by Amusement Makers, publishers of the PC-98 Touhou games. Leaving the group in 2001 but remaining at Taito, he formed the one-man doujin circle Team Shanghai Alice, initially applying as a music circle to the 61st Comiket. After a denial, ZUN then instead decided to develop a full game to submit at Comiket 62, reviving the Touhou Project series. The jump from PC-98 to Windows represented a "clean slate" for both the series and its developer, and so Embodiment of Scarlet Devil essentially serves as a soft reboot of the series.

Due to the handmade nature of indie dōjinshi works, initial sales of the game were low, being sold for one day at a single Comiket booth. Over the next few months, ZUN would start to open mail orders online for the game. Reception of the game was largely positive: the series soon developed a devout cult following. At Comiket 63, four months after release, there was a single derivative circle dedicated to Touhou; this number would grow to 2,372 circles seven years later, breaking the convention's record. The series' move to Windows allowed for Embodiment of Scarlet Devil to reach a much wider audience, and it remains not only one of the most popular and acclaimed Touhou games to date, but one of the most popular games of all time in Japan. Physical copies of the game have been self-published and sold for almost 20 years. In 2013, ZUN stated that Embodiment of Scarlet Devil was the best-selling Touhou game.

Gameplay 

Embodiment of Scarlet Devil is a vertical scrolling shoot 'em up. The game offers two playable characters to choose from, each having two shot types. Reimu Hakurei, the miko of the Hakurei Shrine, covers a wide area of the screen with weaker attacks and a small hitbox, whereas Marisa Kirisame relies on her speed and power to make up for her thinner attack spread. The player can enter Focus mode, which slows the player character, making it easier to dodge enemy attacks. Embodiment of Scarlet Devil is the only Windows game that does not show the player's hitbox while focusing – this is remedied in Perfect Cherry Blossom. The player has the option to use bombs, which will grant temporary invulnerability, clear the screen of enemy bullets, and deal immense damage, but the player has a limited supply of bombs, meaning they must be used cautiously. Bombs act differently depending on the character and shot type chosen. If the player is hit by an enemy bullet, and uses a bomb within a six frame window, they can avoid death, a technique known as "deathbombing". Unique to Embodiment of Scarlet Devil, the amount of time in which a player can perform a deathbomb is decreased each time it is successfully done.

Bosses and midbosses appear at the end and middle of the game's stages respectively. Embodiment of Scarlet Devil is the first Touhou game to utilise the Spell Card system. Each boss in the game uses various attack phases, or Spell Cards, of which all are given a name, unlike the PC-98 games' random attacks. These are used in a specific order depending on difficulty and character choice. Each Spell Card has its own countdown timer – defeating an enemy Spell Card before time runs out will grant a point bonus, and a further bonus is given if they are completed without dying or using any bombs. When a Spell Card times out, the boss switches to its next attack with no point bonus given. There are 64 Spell Cards in total, and they can be viewed in the "Score" menu once the player has encountered them.

Points can be acquired in various ways. The "Graze" system grants the player 500 points for each bullet they narrowly avoid. Shooting enemies and collecting point and power items that they drop on death will also increase the number of points. Points are deducted if the player dies or uses their bombs. Power items increase the player's shot power, giving it more damage and a larger cone of fire, and when at maximum power (128), the player can move to the top of the screen to collect all on-screen items at once. Collecting enough points will grant the player extra lives and bombs. The amount of lives the player starts with can be chosen in the options menu – the default is three, and starting with less or more lives will apply a positive or negative multiplier to the player's score respectively. A "Play Rank" system also exists, which makes the game slightly easier if the player dies, and slightly harder if the player scores more points.

The game features six stages and four levels of difficulty – Easy difficulty prematurely ends the game after stage five, automatically granting the bad ending. Depending on difficulty, a positive or negative multiplier bonus is applied and also given at the end of each stage. As with previous games in the series, an additional "Extra Stage" is unlocked in the main menu if the player completes the game without using a continue.

Plot

Setting
A small number of humans live in Gensokyo, however. The main character of the series, she is often tasked with resolving supernatural "incidents" caused in and around Gensokyo. Marisa Kirisame, the other main playable character of the series, is a smug human who has become a magician through sheer hard work, and generally prioritizes self-interest and her own kleptomania over the interests of others. The player chooses either to play as Reimu or Marisa, who each have separate scenarios.

Story
In Gensokyo, the sky becomes covered in red mist, blocking out the sun in the middle of summertime, which becomes known as the Scarlet Mist Incident (紅霧異変). Reimu Hakurei becomes determined to find the cause of the red mist, as if left alone, the mist would spread across Gensokyo's border to the human world. Marisa Kirisame hopes that the person responsible for the mist would have some interesting items to collect.

The heroine observes that the mist is coming from the direction of the Misty Lake (霧の湖). Travelling in that direction, she stumbles across the  Rumia, and later the ice fairy Cirno, determining neither are related to the mist – instead, the Scarlet Devil Mansion (紅魔館), which seems to have appeared from out of nowhere, is discovered to be the cause. The mansion's guard, Hong Meiling, resident anemic witch, Patchouli Knowledge, and time-stopping maid, Sakuya Izayoi, all try and stop the intruder from reaching the lord of the mansion, Remilia Scarlet, but fail. Remilia, a vampire, tells the heroine that she created the mist to block out the sun so that she could feel comfortable during the day. After defeating Remilia, if the player has not used any continues, the mist is removed, and Remilia compromises with walking around with a parasol in daylight.

Extra Stage

A few days pass, and Remilia returns to the Hakurei Shrine to chat with the heroines, leaving care of the mansion to Sakuya. All of a sudden, a harsh storm brews, but only around the mansion, and Remilia confides to the heroines that she can't go back to the mansion in this weather. They leave, and Remilia realises that Patchouli has cast a storm over the mansion to prevent her younger sister Flandre Scarlet from escaping. The chosen heroine encounters Flandre in the mansion, where she claims she has been locked in the basement for 495 years. Flandre asks that the heroine plays with her, and they defeat her. Reimu promises that they will play with her again another time, while Marisa taunts her with quotes from the poem Ten Little Indians.

Development

Mystic Square and hiatus
After the release of the previous Touhou game, Mystic Square in 1998, ZUN, creator and developer of the series, graduated from university. Mystic Square was intended to be the final Touhou installment as ZUN "sealing" his  activities – he had originally planned to stop with Lotus Land Story. He would go on to work at Taito as a game developer, and also composed music for various games created by members of Amusement Makers, the publishers of the PC-98 Touhou games, like Seihou Project. ZUN left Amusement Makers in 2001, but continued to work at Taito until 2007, meaning each Touhou game until Mountain of Faith was developed concurrently with ZUN's work at Taito, which include Magic Pengel: The Quest for Color, Bujingai, Graffiti Kingdom and Exit, as well as some other games that were ultimately cancelled. ZUN would reenter  activities by establishing his own dōjin circle, changing his developer team name from "ZUN Soft" to Team Shanghai Alice, although initially the circle was not meant to develop games. ZUN applied to Comiket 61 under this name as a music circle, but was rejected. ZUN would instead decide to develop a game before the next Comiket, reviving the Touhou Project series. An announcement was then made on ZUN's blog promoting the game.

Conception and design

As PC-98 usage declined in comparison to Microsoft's Windows architecture in Japan around the late 90s, Embodiment of Scarlet Devil marks the first time ZUN programmed a Windows application from scratch. As ZUN was more familiar with APIs and DirectX and was relatively unfamiliar with the application level, a lot of time was put into creating libraries and tools for the game. Some libraries were borrowed from Seihou – as thanks, Ponchi, a member of Seihou'''s development team, is given a credit as "Program Support". As a result, little time remained to improve the game's presentation, and ZUN resolved to improve the next game in that regard. The game's basic engine would later be reused for the games Perfect Cherry Blossom and Imperishable Night. In 2013, ZUN stated fragments of code from the game were still being reused in Double Dealing Character.

As Embodiment of Scarlet Devil would be the first release of Team Shanghai Alice and the first game made for a Windows audience, ZUN felt that the game would need to leave an impression. This resulted in the game's Western theme, unlike most other games in the Touhou Project which have a more oriental theme. This also allowed the game's plot to be contained within its own narrative – Embodiment of Scarlet Devil does not mention or feature any PC-98 era characters bar Reimu and Marisa. Now regarding his past works as juvenilia, the jump from PC-98 to Windows represented a "clean slate" for both ZUN and the series: Embodiment of Scarlet Devil essentially serves as a soft reboot. ZUN has since remarked how the general theme and direction of Touhou only started to come together during the development of Embodiment of Scarlet Devil. Some references are used from other material, mainly from the 1939 Agatha Christie mystery novel And Then There Were None for symbolism and dialogue in the game.

ZUN's general goal for Embodiment of Scarlet Devil was to stay away from over-complication, and to let the player have fun simply dodging bullets. The Spell Card system was created by ZUN in 1999 while working on Seihou, and was intended to be a means to identify bullet patterns with names as well as adding depth to his characters. ZUN further stated that Embodiment of Scarlet Devil itself was created for the purpose of introducing this system, and it has featured in every game after. ZUN also had interest during development in making a danmaku game in which the player could switch between two characters easily during the game, as he believed there weren't many games that incorporated such a system. However, he felt that having playable characters that had not been previously introduced would be unnatural, and so this system was reserved until Imperishable Night, where he had determined enough characters had been introduced to the series. A demo version of the game, containing the first three stages, was distributed online on June 10, 2002, and is still available for download today. (Direct trial download link) A portrait of an unused character named Rin Satsuki was used to advertise Embodiment of Scarlet Devil at Comiket 62 – she was ultimately cut from the game due to time constraints.

ZUN has stated his intention to re-release Embodiment of Scarlet Devil on Steam, but due to compatibility issues when running the game in fullscreen on Windows 10, the frame rate does not have a limit, causing the game to move at such a speed that it is unplayable. A similar bug was known to ZUN upon the game's release. Fan patches to remedy this have since been released, but ZUN said that he was not able to fix the issue himself, as he has lost the source code.

Music

The game's soundtrack was originally composed for the Roland SC-88 Pro sound module. However, ZUN decided to arrange and re-record the soundtrack in WAV format using a Roland Edirol SD-90 he had recently purchased, just before the game was released. As a result, two separate versions of the soundtrack exist, although the original MIDI files will only play correctly on an SC-88 Pro, meaning the WAV version of the soundtrack is by far the most recognised. ZUN has stated he was aiming to give the game's music a "brighter" feel over the PC-98 games by attempting to add jazz-fusion elements to the soundtrack, and that Remilia Scarlet's theme "Septette for the Dead Princess" and Flandre Scarlet's theme "U.N. Owen Was Her?" were the songs he most thought of as representative of the game. "Septette for the Dead Princess" is a homage to Maurice Ravel's Pavane for a Dead Princess. The name of "U.N. Owen Was Her?" is taken from the novel's "Una Nancy Owen" character – ZUN states it relates to Flandre since like U.N. Owen, she is also an unknown being. Quotes and references from the book are also used in Marisa's dialogue. In August 2021, the game's soundtrack was released on Spotify along with all other non PC-98 games in the series.

 Reception and legacy 

Upon release at Comiket 62, Embodiment of Scarlet Devil sold considerably more than any of the PC-98 games, beyond expectation. Because of this, initial circulation of the game was very limited, later being sold through online CD retailers. Retrospective Japanese reviews have been positive, looking back on the game with nostalgia about its unique atmosphere. In a 2018 retrospective, IGN Japan's Shin Amai named Embodiment of Scarlet Devil the best game of 2002, calling the bullet hell mechanics mediocre, but that the level design, music, and presentation's charm make the game a masterpiece that would go on to become one of the most popular Japanese games of all time. In a 2010 episode of MAG.Net, radio producer Yamaken criticised the game and its development for its overtly casual, laid-back atmosphere, stating that the character art and dialogue of the game were very poor, but noted that the poor quality motivated people to produce more fanwork about the Touhou Project series. In 2013, ZUN said that Embodiment of Scarlet Devil was the overall best selling Touhou game. As of July 2021, physical copies of the game are still being produced and sold, almost twenty years after release. The game has never been officially released in a language other than Japanese, but fan translation patches for the game are available. ZUN does not plan to give any Touhou game an official English translation, stating that he has more faith in his fans to handle localisation than a third-party company.

As a result, Embodiment of Scarlet Devil is largely responsible for sowing the seeds for the series' growth in popularity, helped by ZUN allowing the use of characters, music and other qualities of the series to be used freely in fan works with attribution. Fans would start to sell derivative content at Comiket, starting with Comiket 63 just six months later with one derivative booth. By Comiket 77, this number had grown to 2,372 circles dedicated to Touhou. This would break the convention's record held by The Prince of Tennis at Comiket 66.Embodiment of Scarlet Devil consistently ranks as one of the most popular entries in the Touhou Project series. In annual polls conducted by the Japanese Touhou Wiki, Embodiment of Scarlet Devil has been voted the most popular game each year since 2016. All named characters who are introduced in Embodiment of Scarlet Devil have become recurring characters throughout the series, being featured as either playable characters, bosses, or background cameos. As a result, every character (even including unnamed midbosses) introduced in Embodiment of Scarlet Devil rank consistently high in popularity polls: in a 2020 poll, every character ranked amongst the top 30, with three in the top 10.

The music of Embodiment of Scarlet Devil is also consistently praised as amongst the best in the series. Flandre's boss theme "U.N. Owen Was Her?" is notable for creating an internet meme and spreading the popularity of the series in the West. It has been remarked that the 2008 viral video "Ronald McDonald Insanity" or "McRoll'd" which remixes the song with samples of Ronald McDonald was the first contact with Touhou for thousands of Western internet users – the two videos share over 21 million views as of July 2021. It is also notable for its use in the rise of the Black MIDI scene, which involve MIDI compositions that contain notes in the trillions. A Synthesia version of "U.N. Owen Was Her?" uploaded to YouTube in December 2009 mislabelled as composer John Stump's "Faerie's Aire and Death Waltz" amassed tens of millions of views, causing confusion and plagiarism accusations towards Stump to amass.  Because of this, "U.N. Owen Was Her?" spread virally online under the "Death Waltz" name, and the original piece is largely unknown by most, bearing no resemblance to "U.N. Owen Was Her?". "U.N. Owen Was Her?" and Remilia's boss theme "Septette for the Dead Princess" have alternated between first and second place in music popularity rankings of Touhou since 2014.

Cirno's boss theme, "Beloved Tomboyish Girl" was later remixed by  group IOSYS into "Cirno's Perfect Math Class" in 2008, which too became an internet meme parodying the series, and the character's lack of intelligence. Toby Fox, the creator of Undertale, has cited Touhou as a major influence both musically and gameplay-wise, as he downloaded Embodiment of Scarlet Devil and Perfect Cherry Blossom during middle school. Parts of the soundtrack for Undertale use the same instruments as Embodiment of Scarlet Devil's soundtrack, and the mini-bullet hell attacks present in the game resemble Touhou&NoBreak;'s gameplay.

Notable fanmade Touhou games that adopt the setting of Embodiment of Scarlet Devil include Touhou Luna Nights, Koumajou Densetsu: Scarlet Symphony and the second chapter of Touhou LostWord. Fanmade anime have also been made for the game.  by the circle Manpuku Jinja adapts the story of Embodiment of Scarlet Devil to anime form while  uses the setting and characters of Embodiment of Scarlet Devil in an original story. Summer Day's Dream'' is notable for starring high-ranking professional seiyuu, such as Rie Tanaka, Miyuki Sawashiro, Aoi Yuuki, and Aki Toyosaki.

Notes

References

External links 
  
 Official Team Shanghai Alice/ZUN website 
 Official Touhou Project website 
Embodiment of Scarlet Devil on Touhou Wiki

2002 video games
Touhou Project games
Bullet hell video games
Indie video games
Video games with alternate endings
Shoot 'em ups
Video games developed in Japan
Windows games
Windows-only games
Internet memes introduced in 2008